The Taiwan Sugar Research Institute (TSRI) is a sugar research center of Taiwan Sugar Corporation in East District, Tainan, Taiwan.

History
The research center was founded in 1901 during the Japanese colonial era.

Facilities
The research center spread over 387 hectares of land, including 375 hectares of experimental farmland. It contains a series of bio-reactors and downstream processing facilities, such as chromatography columns, membrane separators, spray drier and crystallizer.

Research
The current research TSRI is undergoing is to find new techniques to raise as much sugarcane as possible per area of usable land and to discover new and resistant sugarcane species from disease and pests.

See also
 Agriculture in Taiwan
 Taiwan Agricultural Research institute
 Taiwan Banana Research Institute

References

External links
  

1901 establishments in Taiwan
Agricultural research institutes in Taiwan
East District, Tainan
Organizations based in Tainan
Sugar organizations